A non-reversing mirror (sometimes referred to as a flip mirror) is a mirror that presents its subject as it would be seen from the mirror.  A non-reversing mirror can be made by connecting two regular mirrors at their edges at a 90 degree angle. If the join is positioned so that it is vertical, an observer looking into the angle will see a non-reversed image. This can be seen in places such as public toilets when there are two mirrors mounted on walls which meet at right angles. Such an image is visible while looking towards the corner where the two mirrors meet. The problem with this type of non-reversing mirror is that there is usually a line down the middle interrupting the image. However, if first-surface mirrors are used, and care is taken to set the angle to exactly 90 degrees, the join can be made almost invisible.

Another type of non-reversing mirror can be made by making the mirror concave (curved inwards like a bowl). At a certain distance from the mirror a non-reversed image will appear. The disadvantage of this is that it only works at a certain distance.

A third type of non-reversing mirror was created by mathematics professor R. Andrew Hicks in 2009. It was created using computer algorithms to generate a "disco ball" like surface. The thousands of tiny mirrors are angled to create a surface which curves and bends in different directions. The curves direct rays from an object across the mirror's face before sending them back to the viewer, flipping the conventional mirror image.

A patent for a non-reversing mirror was issued to John Joseph Hooker in 1887.

See also

 Corner reflector
 Retroreflector

References

External links

Glass applications